The 2nd government of Turkey (6 March 1924 – 22 November 1924) was the second government in the history of the Republic of Turkey.

Background 
The prime minister was İsmet İnönü of the Republican People's Party (CHP, than known as People’s Party). İnönü was also the prime minister of the first government, but following a radical change in the structure of the government (the abolition of two critical ministries), İnönü formed his second government.

The government
In the list below, the cabinet members who served only a part of the cabinet's lifespan are shown in the column "Notes".

In 1924, surnames were not in use in Turkey, which would remain true until the Surname Law. The surnames given in the list are the surnames the members of the cabinet assumed later.

Aftermath
After the formation of a strong opposition, i.e., Progressive Republican Party (TCP), the president Mustafa Kemal Atatürk assigned Fethi Okyar, a moderate politician, as the prime minister, in his first effort to jump-start a multi-party democracy in Turkey.

Trivia
Four members of this government were future prime ministers: Recep Peker, Refik Saydam, Celal Bayar, and Hasan Saka.

References

02
Republican People's Party (Turkey) politicians
1924 establishments in Turkey
1924 disestablishments in Turkey
Cabinets established in 1924
Cabinets disestablished in 1924
Members of the 2nd government of Turkey
2nd parliament of Turkey
Republican People's Party (Turkey)